The 1911 VPI football team represented Virginia Agricultural and Mechanical College and Polytechnic Institute in the 1911 college football season. The team was led by their head coach Lew Riess and finished with a record of six wins, one loss, and two ties (6–1–2).

Schedule

Players
The following players were members of the 1911 football team according to the roster published in the 1912 edition of The Bugle, the Virginia Tech yearbook.

Game summaries

Cancelled Game with Western Maryland
VPI was scheduled to play Western Maryland College on October 21, but Western Maryland cancelled and VPI played Roanoke.

References

VPI
Virginia Tech Hokies football seasons
VPI football